Kalmakovo (Qalmaq) is a rural locality (a village) in Khalilovsky Selsoviet, Abzelilovsky District, Bashkortostan, Russia. The population was 22 as of 2010. There is 1 street.

Geography 
Kalmakovo is located 31 km south of Askarovo (the district's administrative centre) by road. Ishkulovo is the nearest rural locality.

References 

Rural localities in Abzelilovsky District